Siang, or Ot Siang, is a Barito language of the central Kalimantan, Indonesia.

References 

West Barito languages
Languages of Indonesia